Pearl City High School can refer to:

Pearl City High School (Illinois) in Pearl City, Illinois
Pearl City High School (Hawaii) in City and County of Honolulu, Hawaii